Juliette Lake Lewis (born June 21, 1973) is an American actress, model and alternative rock singer. She is known for her portrayals of offbeat characters, often in films with dark themes. Lewis became an "it girl" of American cinema in the early 1990s, appearing in various independent and arthouse films. Her accolades include a Pasinetti Award, one Academy Award nomination, one Golden Globe nomination, and a Primetime Emmy Award nomination.

The daughter of character actor Geoffrey Lewis, Lewis began her career in television at age 14 before making her feature film debut with a small part in My Stepmother Is an Alien (1988). This was followed by a more prominent role as Audrey Griswold in National Lampoon's Christmas Vacation (1989). She then garnered international notice for her portrayal of Danielle Bowden in Martin Scorsese's remake of Cape Fear (1991), which saw Lewis nominated for an Academy Award for Best Supporting Actress, as well as the Golden Globe in the same category.

Following the success of Cape Fear, Lewis had supporting roles in Husbands and Wives (1992), Kalifornia (1993), and What's Eating Gilbert Grape (1993). She gained further attention for her lead role as Mallory Knox in Oliver Stone's controversial crime film Natural Born Killers (1994), which earned her the Pasinetti Award for Best Actress at the Venice Film Festival. Subsequent roles included Strange Days (1995), The Basketball Diaries (1995), From Dusk Till Dawn (1996), The Other Sister (1999), and The Way of the Gun (2000).

The 2000s saw Lewis appearing in a series of supporting parts in independent features and studio films, and in 2003 she earned an Emmy nomination for Outstanding Supporting Actress for the television film Hysterical Blindness (2002). She went on to appear in comedies such as Old School (2003) and Starsky & Hutch (2004), and embarked on a musical career in 2003, forming the rock band Juliette and the Licks. Since 2009, she has been releasing material as a solo artist. Subsequent film roles have included Whip It (2009), Conviction (2010), The Switch (2010), August: Osage County (2013), and Ma (2019). Since the mid-to-late 2010s, Lewis has worked more frequently in television, appearing in prominent roles in series such as The Firm (2012), Wayward Pines (2015), Secrets and Lies (2015–2016), The Act (2019), Sacred Lies (2020), Queer as Folk, and Welcome to Chippendales (both 2022). Since 2021, she has played Natalie on Showtime's Yellowjackets.

Life and career

1973–1986: Early life
Juliette Lake Lewis was born June 21, 1973, in Los Angeles, California, to actor Geoffrey Lewis and his first wife, Glenis ( Duggan) Batley, a graphic designer. She has seven siblings or half-siblings including Lightfield (an actor who appeared in The New WKRP in Cincinnati), Peter, Miles, Matthew, Brandy, Hannah, and Dierdre. She has a step-sister, Emily Colombier.

When she was two years old, Lewis's parents divorced, and she spent her childhood living between both their homes in the Los Angeles area. Her first on-screen appearance was an uncredited bit part in Bronco Billy (1980), in which her father played a supporting role.

1987–1999: Early career and success
Lewis made her first major screen appearance in the television film Home Fires (1987). Howard Rosenberg of the Los Angeles Times praised Lewis's performance in the film, writing that she "lights up the screen." She subsequently starred on the television series I Married Dora, which ran between 1987 and 1988. At age 14, she was legally emancipated from her parents (with their approval) in order to enable her to more freely work. Lewis recalled her emancipation: "I know that sounds all radical, but when you start acting when you’re younger, you talk to other actor kids and their moms, and they’re like, 'Yeah, if you want to get a job, they like on your resume to say emancipated minor versus minor, because you then can work over eight hours.'" For a brief period, Lewis lived with actress Karen Black, who was a mentor to her. At age 15, Lewis dropped out of high school.

She subsequently had a minor part in the science fiction comedy My Stepmother Is an Alien (1988), before landing her first major supporting role as Audrey Griswold in National Lampoon's Christmas Vacation (1989). She followed this with roles in the dystopian film Meet the Hollowheads, and the comedy The Runnin' Kind (both 1989). The same year, Lewis had a guest-starring role as Wayne's girlfriend, Delores, on the series The Wonder Years.

In 1990, Lewis co-starred with Brad Pitt in the Lifetime television film Too Young to Die?, a crime film loosely based on the case of Attina Marie Cannaday, playing a troubled young woman who falls into a world of prostitution and drugs. During this period, Lewis herself was met with legal trouble after entering a bar at age 16, for which she was arrested and charged with underage drinking.

Lewis garnered international attention and acclaim for her performance as Danielle Bowden, the daughter of a family targeted by psychopathic criminal Max Cady (Robert De Niro), in Martin Scorsese's remake of Cape Fear (1991), also starring Jessica Lange and Nick Nolte. Vincent Canby of The New York Times lauded her performance, writing: "Though Danielle recognizes Max, she is willingly implicated in his scheme. It is one of Mr. De Niro's finest moments. It also reveals Miss Lewis to be a new young actress of stunning possibilities. The sequence is the heart of the movie." Lewis garnered critical acclaim for her performance, and was nominated for a Golden Globe Award, as well as an Academy Award for Best Supporting Actress. Retrospectively, her character's seduction sequence was named one of the most unforgettable scenes in film history by Entertainment Weekly and Complex.

In 1992, she had a supporting role as a college student in Woody Allen's Husbands and Wives, followed by That Night, a coming-of-age drama set in the 1960s. Lewis appeared in several films in 1993, including Peter Medak's neo-noir Romeo Is Bleeding, in which she played the mistress of a corrupt cop, played by Gary Oldman. She then reunited with former co-star Brad Pitt in the thriller Kalifornia, in which she starred as a childlike woman whose boyfriend is a serial killer. Critic Roger Ebert deemed Lewis's performance in the latter film one "of the most harrowing and convincing performances I've ever seen." At the time of filming Kalifornia, Lewis and Pitt had been in a relationship since 1990, though they separated the year of the film's release. She subsequently co-starred with Johnny Depp and Leonardo DiCaprio in the Lasse Hallström-directed drama What's Eating Gilbert Grape (1993), portraying a free-spirited woman who befriends a young man and his mentally disabled brother in a small town. Lewis appeared in the video for the Melissa Etheridge song "Come to My Window", (1993), portraying a mental patient.

Lewis portrayed Mallory Knox, a murderous woman who embarks on a killing spree with her psychotic lover Mickey (Woody Harrelson), in Oliver Stone's controversial satirical crime film Natural Born Killers (1994). Though the film was criticized for its graphic violence and inspiring of copycat crimes, Lewis's performance was praised as "sensational" by critic Peter Travers, and won her the Pasinetti Award for Best Actress at the Venice Film Festival. The same year, she had a supporting role in Nora Ephron's Christmas-themed comedy Mixed Nuts. Lewis subsequently played a rock singer in Kathryn Bigelow's science fiction film Strange Days (1995), doing her own singing on covers of two songs written by PJ Harvey. Though a major box-office failure, Strange Days went on to develop a cult following in subsequent years. Lewis reunited with her What's Eating Gilbert Grape co-star DiCaprio, appearing with him in a supporting role in the crime drama The Basketball Diaries (1995). This same year, at age 22, Lewis entered drug rehabilitation, having been addicted to cocaine and prescription medication for several years, and completed the Narconon program within the Church of Scientology.

The following year, Lewis had a leading role in The Evening Star (1996), a flop sequel to Terms of Endearment (1983), opposite Shirley MacLaine and Bill Paxton. She appeared in Robert Rodriguez's action horror film From Dusk till Dawn (1996). In the film, written by and co-starring Quentin Tarantino, Lewis portrayed a teenage girl who is kidnapped, along with her family, by bank robbers who take them to a bar inhabited by vampires. Lewis next appeared in Some Girl (1998), followed by The Other Sister (1999), in which she portrayed a mentally challenged young woman attempting to find independence. The film received largely unfavorable reviews, though Stephen Holden of The New York Times praised it as "beautifully acted...  Carla is played by Ms. Lewis with enormous heart and sensitivity, and with body language so precise that you soon forget it is a performance." In September 1999, Lewis married professional skateboarder Steve Berra.

2000–2010: Film, television, and music
In 2000, Lewis starred in the thriller The Way of the Gun, and was featured as a vocalist on the track "Bad Brother" by the band The Infidels, from The Crow: Salvation soundtrack album, released on April that year. She appeared in the crime film Picture Claire (2001), followed by the independent lesbian-themed drama Gaudi Afternoon (2001). The film received unfavorable reviews, with A. O. Scott of The New York Times writing that both Lili Taylor and Lewis "overact like second-string sketch performers on Saturday Night Live." Lewis subsequently had a supporting role in the drama Enough (2002), playing the friend of a battered woman.

Lewis received an Emmy nomination for Outstanding Supporting Actress for her performance in the television film Hysterical Blindness (2002), in which she starred as the friend of a woman in 1980s New Jersey who receives a psychiatric diagnosis. Additionally, she received an Independent Spirit Award nomination for Best Supporting Female. Next, Lewis had a supporting role as the lover of an unstable man terrorizing a family in the thriller Cold Creek Manor (2003). She also appeared in the HIM music video for "Buried Alive By Love" in 2003, and had a supporting part in the comedy Old School. In April 2003, Lewis filed for divorce from husband Berra after approximately three years of marriage. Lewis described the divorce as "amicable", and later commented: "Steve would be the first to admit he was a workaholic. You have to be ready to have a partnership. And sometimes you’re like, 'Whoa, this is too much. I only actually have enough steam to focus on my own thing.'"

Beginning in 2003, Lewis embarked on a musical career, forming the rock band Juliette and the Licks with former Hole drummer Patty Schemel. The band released their debut EP, ...Like a Bolt of Lightning, in late 2004 through Fiddler Records. She appeared as a guest vocalist on three tracks by electronic music group The Prodigy's album Always Outnumbered, Never Outgunned (also released in 2004). The same year, Lewis appeared in the comedy film Starsky & Hutch, playing the role of Kitty, and had a supporting part in the Jan Kounen's French futuristic Western film Blueberry. She subsequently appeared in comedy Daltry Calhoun (2005), playing the girlfriend of a Tennessee entrepreneur, and in the drama Aurora Borealis (also 2005), playing the live-in assistant of an elderly couple. In May 2005, Juliette and the Licks released their debut studio album, You're Speaking My Language. The band toured internationally in support of the album, and received a favorable concert review from The Guardians David Peschek, who wrote that Lewis is "exactly the kind of iconic presence that boringly boy-saturated rock needs. The Licks–they are very definitely a band, not just the star and some flunkies–are fantastic."

Lewis had a supporting part in the 2006-released The Darwin Awards, an independent comedy, followed by Catch and Release, a romantic comedy that premiered at the Austin Film Festival in October 2006. The same year, Juliette and the Licks recorded their second studio album, Four on the Floor, which featured drumming by Dave Grohl, and was released in 2007. In 2006, Blender magazine included Lewis in their hottest women of rock music list. In 2008, Lewis appeared in Rockstar Games' Grand Theft Auto IV, providing the voice of "Juliette", the host of fictional radio station Radio Broker, along with one of her own songs "Inside The Cage (David Gilmour Girls Remix)". Lewis had a featured role in Drew Barrymore's directorial debut Whip It! (2009), about a female roller derby player, and provided voice work for the animated science fiction film Metropia (also 2009), directed by Tarik Saleh. The same year, Lewis released her first solo studio album, titled Terra Incognita, through The End Records.

In 2010, Lewis starred in a number of films, first appearing in Mark Ruffalo's directorial debut Sympathy for Delicious, about a paralyzed disc jockey, followed by the comedy The Switch (2010), in which she appeared as the friend of a woman trying to conceive a child through artificial insemination. She appeared as a murder witness in the biographical crime film Conviction. Though only featured in a small portion of the film, The Wall Street Journal deemed Lewis a "scene-stealer," and she subsequently won the Boston Society of Film Critics Award Best Supporting Actress. Additionally, Lewis had a role in Todd Phillips's black comedy Due Date, reprising her role of Heidi in Old School (2003).

2011–present: Television and film
Lewis's first film in 2011 was the independent drama Hick, in which she starred as the alcoholic mother of a young girl in 1980s Nebraska. Lewis subsequently had a minor role in the Canadian drama Foreverland. She followed this with the thriller Open Road, and a starring role in the short-lived series The Firm, on NBC as Tammy, assistant to lead character Mitch McDeere. Next, Lewis had a central role in the dramedy film August: Osage County (2013), playing one of several sisters who reunite with their dysfunctional mother at their familial Oklahoma home after their father commits suicide. An adaptation of Tracy Letts' play of the same name, August: Osage County was a box-office success, grossing $37 million in the United States.

Lewis was involved in musical projects in 2013, contributing backing vocals to the track "Saint of Impossible Causes", on Joseph Arthur's tenth studio album The Ballad of Boogie Christ. She appeared in the music video for "City of Angels" by Thirty Seconds to Mars.

In 2014, Lewis had lead roles in the drama Hellion and in the independent comedy Kelly & Cal, in which Lewis portrayed a former punk-turned-suburban housewife. Lewis subsequent had a lead role as a music producer in Jem and the Holograms (2015), a film adaptation of the 1980s animated series Jem. The film was a box-office bomb, and received largely negative response from critics of the television series. Lewis followed this with a lead role as a small-town detective on the ABC crime series Secrets and Lies, which aired two seasons. She had a recurring guest role in the first season of the science fiction mystery series Wayward Pines (2015). Also in 2015, Lewis contributed vocals to the song "Stickup" by electronic artists Karma Fields & Morten, which was released on Monstercat in November that year. Lewis had a supporting role in the techno thriller film Nerve (2016), about an online video game.

In November 2016, Lewis returned to music with her first solo EP, Future Deep, which she released independently, marking her first musical project in seven years. She described the EP as "an eclectic bunch of songs tinged with the darkest blues, contagious 60s garage rock and dance funk anthems." Lewis subsequently guest-starred on season two of the comedy series Graves (2017), and appeared as a reiki healer on the comedy series Camping (2018), adapted from the British series of the same name. Judy Berman of Time magazine gave the series an unfavorable review, writing that Lewis is "underutilized, as usual."

Also in 2018, Lewis appeared in the independent drama film Back Roads, about a young man trapped by circumstance in rural Pennsylvania after his mother (played by Lewis) murders his father. She was cast in a supporting role in Sam Taylor-Johnson's A Million Little Pieces, adapted from the book of the same name by James Frey. In late 2018, Lewis was cast in the premiere season of The Conners, a spin-off of Roseanne, playing Blue, girlfriend of Darlene Conner's ex-husband David Healy. Lewis subsequently appeared in Tate Taylor's psychological horror film Ma (2019), playing the mother of one of several teenagers who grow close to a disturbed woman (Octavia Spencer) in their neighborhood. Ma was a box-office success, grossing over $60 million worldwide, and was nominated for a Saturn Award for Best Thriller Film. Lewis had a guest role on Hulu's biographical crime series The Act, chronicling the life of Gypsy Rose Blanchard and the murder of her mother, which premiered in March 2019.

Lewis reunited again with Tate Taylor for his film Breaking News in Yuba County, filmed in the summer of 2019. In 2022, Lewis appeared in the Showtime thriller series, Yellowjackets.

Philanthropy
Lewis has supported Little Kids Rock, an American nonprofit organization that works to restore and revitalize music education in disadvantaged U.S. public schools, by painting a Fender Stratocaster guitar and donating it to an auction to raise money for the organization.

Personal life
Lewis was born into Scientology and started practicing it in the 1990s. She credited Scientology's Narconon program for helping her rehabilitate after a years-long drug addiction in her early adult years. When asked in 2010 by Vanity Fair if she was a Scientologist, Lewis responded "I am, yeah," and went on to explain: "I'm a Christian! I think there's so much confusion because people don't understand a religion where you can be another religion but you can still practice Scientology."

In an interview with Time in 2015, Lewis remarked about protecting her freedom of choice and religion, and being annoyed at people's misconceptions about Scientology; "whatever people's conceptions are of me, I think it's cute. I roll with it." In December 2021 she told The New York Times she was a spiritualist and does not identify as a Scientologist.

Filmography

Discography

Juliette and the Licks

Albums 
 You're Speaking My Language (2005)
 Four on the Floor (2006)

EP 

 …Like a Bolt of Lightning (2004)

Juliette Lewis

Album 
 Terra Incognita (2009)

EP 
 Future Deep (2017)

Other appearances 

 "Hardly Wait" (1995) PJ Harvey cover from Strange Days
 "Come Rain or Come Shine" (1999) from The Other Sister
 "Danny Boy Song" (2004) from Blueberry
 "Hotride", "Spitfire", and "Get Up Get Off", from the 2004 Prodigy album Always Outnumbered, Never Outgunned.

Accolades

References

External links

1973 births
Living people
20th-century American actresses
21st-century American actresses
21st-century American singers
21st-century American women singers
Actresses from Los Angeles
American child actresses
American film actresses
American former Scientologists
American people of Welsh descent
American television actresses
American women rock singers
Juliette and the Licks members
Musicians from Los Angeles
Singers from California